Anne Christine Snelgrove (born 7 August 1957) is a British Labour Party politician, who was the Member of Parliament (MP) for Swindon South from 2005 to 2010; from June 2009 to May 2010, she was a Parliamentary Private Secretary to Prime Minister Gordon Brown. In the 2010 general election, she lost her constituency of Swindon South to Conservative MP Robert Buckland. She unsuccessfully contested the seat again for the Labour party at the 2015 general election.

She launched the Geared for Giving campaign in May 2008 with Duncan Bannatyne OBE.

She later chose to step down from this position and in September 2015 began working for a secondary school – focusing on educating students in Drama and Media Studies. She left in 2019 and is retired with her husband Mike Snelgrove.

References

External links
TheyWorkForYou.com - Anne Snelgrove MP

1957 births
Living people
UK MPs 2005–2010
Labour Party (UK) MPs for English constituencies
Female members of the Parliament of the United Kingdom for English constituencies
People from Wokingham
Alumni of the University of Winchester
People educated at Ranelagh Grammar School
Members of the Parliament of the United Kingdom for constituencies in Wiltshire
21st-century British women politicians
Parliamentary Private Secretaries to the Prime Minister
21st-century English women
21st-century English people